Today for the Last Time is a 1958 Czech drama film directed by Martin Frič.

Cast
 Zdeněk Štěpánek as ing. Dada
 Vladimír Ráž as Masek
 Bela Jurdová as Masková
 Vladimír Menšík as Kroc
 Antonie Hegerlíková as Dandová
 Eva Océnasová as Jirina Dandová
 Luděk Munzar as Snoubenec jinny
 Václav Tomsovský as Láda Danda
 Irena Kacírková as Magda Reháková
 Vlastimil Brodský as Starozitník
 František Smolík as Taupe
 Jiří Sovák as Zemánek
 Jaroslav Mareš as Rendl
 Vera Vachová as Venturová
 Václav Lohniský as Reditel

References

External links
 

1958 films
1958 drama films
1950s Czech-language films
Czechoslovak black-and-white films
Films directed by Martin Frič
Czechoslovak drama films
1950s Czech films